Radio Massacre International is a trio of British musicians, Steve Dinsdale (Keyboards and Drums), Duncan Goddard (Keyboards and Bass), and Gary Houghton (Guitar, Synth). They specialize in improvisational experimental electronic music, utilising vintage synthesizers and sampled sounds alongside electric guitar. They are also exponents of the mellotron keyboard. More recently, they have begun to incorporate Bass Guitar and Drums by varying degrees in an attempt to stretch musical boundaries within the confines of a three-piece. Their music has been described alternatively as ambient music, space rock, Krautrock, New Age, Berlin School, and various other terms, although the band itself prefers the label "organic music". Points of reference include bands ranging from Tangerine Dream to "Rabbit"-era Chas and Dave.

Name

The unusual name dates back to the early 1980s, and the trio's early experiments with primitive sounds. The name was coined by Steve to describe cathartic sessions by the band, working away from traditional write/arrange/rehearse methods. Lacking anything but the most basic equipment, the band plugged keyboards & guitars straight into a cassette deck for a more abrasive sound than that achieved with the (mostly borrowed) equipment used in the making of their early recordings as "DAS". Therefore, there is no deeper meaning in the name.
It was adopted as the main name for the band in 1990, as recording in the "DAS" style was wound up. There are 12 DAS "albums" although only the first was ever published (as a cassette album); some of the later titles feature other musicians and any plan to release these recordings would mean hunting down the participants to obtain clearance.

History

The history of the band dates back to the late 1970s when Steve and Duncan went to the same school. They formed the band "DAS" with Gary and recorded 12 albums between 1979 and 1987, most of which were never released.

Steve, who is originally a drummer, went on to play in a couple of 'scene' bands after moving to London in 1988, while Duncan started to amass synthesizers, and recorded the first solo projects. When he finally found a space for him and Steve - who got disillusioned with the music business at that time -  to work in, they recorded a first session in 1993, which was later released as "Startide". Gary re-joined in 1994 with his guitar, and the band as we know it today was born.

Their first official release was the double CD "Frozen North" on Centaur in 1995. They also debuted Radio Massacre International as a live act at the Emma festival in Sheffield in the same year.

In 1996, they were invited to perform on MTVs "Party Zone", making them probably the only band to play a live piece on the dance-orientated show that did not contain a single discernible beat. The same month, they were the first electronic artists to play at the famous Jodrell Bank observatory, in the shadow of the radio dish. This was later released as the humorously titled live CD 'Knutsford in May'.

1997 saw them play at the famous (but now defunct) KLEMdag festival in Nijmegen, Netherlands, in front of the band's largest ever live audience. The year 2000 brought appearances at the Alfa Centauri festival in the Netherlands, and another visit to Jodrell Bank. The band's music was also featured in the BBC-TV programme "Don’t Look Down" about the 300 ft radio telescope.

The first Hampshire Jam festival of electronic music in Liphook in 2001 saw them appear together with other artists of the genre like Air Sculpture, Paul Nagle and Free System Project.
In November 2002, they played their first ever dates in the United States, at the Progwest Festival in LA and at The Gatherings Concert Series in Philadelphia. Furthermore, they appeared twice live on radio, on Alien Air Music on KXLU in LA, and on Star's End on WXPN in Philadelphia. True to form, the band released a 2CD collection documenting this tour (Solid States).

Further live events included the E-Live festival in Eindhoven, the Netherlands in late 2003
and the Virtaa Arts Festival in Tapiola (nr Helsinki), Finland in early 2004. Manchester's The Night and Day Cafe witnessed a 2004 collaborative performance which saw RMI and Can luminary Damo Suzuki perform together for the first time.

A return visit to Philadelphia in 2004 at the invitation of Chuck Van Zyl resulted in a recording contract with USA label Cuneiform Records for which the debut release was 2005's 'Emissaries',a double CD which also featured a full colour comic strip story by artist Matt Howarth

Since 2003, they have given annual performances at the UK National Space Centre in Leicester, performing with fellow artist Ian Boddy as a guest of the band on the last of these occasions in March 2006. RMI then released the 'Septentrional' CD on Boddy's DiN label which was again characterised by a collaborative spirit, with Boddy treating and remixing the material.

In December 2006, they finally released the long-awaited 6 CD compilation "Lost in Space", a career retrospective but containing entirely unreleased material from 1987 to 2003.

In September 2007, they released two CDs. The first, "Rain Falls in Grey" is a release which the band describe in the sleevenotes as "a way of saying goodbye and thanks to a genuine one off", referring to Syd Barrett. The cover art for this release was drawn by Daevid Allen, famous as a member of the group Gong. The second release, "Blacker" was on their own Northern Echo record label. The albums were launched with a rare UK show featuring album guest Martin Archer

Once again they visited the East Coast of the US in November 2007, and played a mostly well-received series of radio sessions and live shows in a variety of contexts, augmented on occasions by Premik Russell Tubbs and Cyndee Lee Rule.

In February 2008, they completed recording of their first film soundtrack, entitled 'City 21' due for release in September 2008 by the Knossus Project.

In June 2008, they played NEARfest in Bethlehem, Pennsylvania, USA, their most high-profile appearance to date.

In October 2008, they played again at the E-Live festival in Eindhoven.

October 2009, saw their second appearance at the Hampshire Jam Festival in Liphook, Hampshire.

2019, saw the band win the prestigious Downe Arms quiz night competition donating the prize money to the village of Castelton's playground fund.

Discography

The band has been prolific, largely due to the improvised and lengthy nature of their musical explorations, releasing over 45 albums.

RMI solo albums
Steve Dinsdale - New Church (2009)
Steve Dinsdale - On The Other Side (2010)
Steve Dinsdale - The Vast Key (2012)
Steve Dinsdale - Within Oirschot (2012)
Duncan Goddard - Electrical Tape (2013)

RMI on various artists compilations
Adrenal - Hollow Words (1996) Radio Music Intermission
Synth Music Direct - Compilation Disc 1 (promo) (1997) Prototypes and Patents
Is there anybody out there? (1998) RMI-Pyramid
Concerts at Jodrell Bank (2000) 1CD of RMI Live at Jodrell Bank/Alfa Centauri Festival
Hampshire Jam Preserved (2001) Pipe / Everybody Say Yeah / Roxette lost in Liphook
E-dition CD sampler #4 (2004) Nucleotide Diversities (excerpt)
E-dition CD sampler #8 (2005) The Emissaries Suite
Awakenings 2005 (2005) Sherwood's Special
Star's End 30th Anniversary Anthology (2007) Philadelphia Rain
Resonance: The Echoes Living Room Concerts vol. 13 (2007) Gibraltar

Sources
History and Tour Diary on the official website

External links
Radio Massacre International

British electronic music groups
Musical groups established in the 1990s
1990s establishments in England